William R. Jacobs Jr., is a professor of Microbiology and Immunology and Professor of Genetics at Albert Einstein College of Medicine in The Bronx, New York, where he is also a Howard Hughes Medical Institute Investigator. Jacobs is a specialist in the molecular  genetics of Mycobacteria. His research efforts are aimed at discovering genes associated with virulence and pathogenicity in M. tuberculosis and developing attenuated strains for use as vaccines. He  is a Founding Scientist at the KwaZulu-Natal Research Institute for Tuberculosis and HIV.

Early career 

In 1985,  Jacobs joined  Barry Bloom's lab at Albert Einstein College of Medicine as a post-doctoral fellow to work on the resurgent problem of tuberculosis. In 1987, the two co-authored a ground-breaking paper published in Nature describing a novel system for the genetic manipulation of  mycobacteria,  "Introduction of Foreign DNA into Mycobacteria Using a Shuttle Phasmid". By demonstrating the utility of shuttle phasmids as DNA transporters between E. coli plasmids and mycobacteriophages, this paved the way for recombinant DNA research for mycobacteria.

Howard Hughes Medical Institute investigator (1990-present) 

Jacobs has been profiled several times in many media publications including The New York Times, Esquire Magazine and Discovery.

References 

1955 births
Living people
Scientists from Pittsburgh
American geneticists
American microbiologists
Edinboro University of Pennsylvania alumni
University of Alabama at Birmingham alumni
Albert Einstein College of Medicine faculty
Howard Hughes Medical Investigators